William Grant Guilford is a retired New Zealand academic, specialising in veterinary nutrition. He is currently Chair of the New Zealand Veterinary Association.

Academic career

After a Bachelor of Veterinary Science and Bachelor of Philosophy at Massey University, Guilford completed a PhD in nutrition from the University of California, Davis. The title of his 1993 thesis was Experimental Studies of Gastrointestinal Ischemia-Reperfusion Injury and Food Sensitivity in Dogs.

He qualified as a specialist in veterinary internal medicine becoming a Diplomate of the American College of Veterinary Internal Medicine in 1988 and a Fellow of the Australian College of Veterinary Scientists in 1992. Guilford worked at the University of Missouri and the University of California, Davis, before returning to New Zealand and Massey University, where he studied food allergies in domestic pets.

Guilford was first author on the third edition of the veterinary textbook Strombeck's Small Animal Gastroenterology. According to the Scopus citation index, he has an H-index of 19 with (from 52 publication and >1000 citations) as of April 2022.

In addition to his work on small animals, Guilford, along with others, highlighted the risks to New Zealand's biosecurity and public health posed by the proposed introduction of exotic dung beetles to New Zealand.

University administrative career 

Guilford served for 10 years as the Foundation Head of the Institute of Veterinary, Animal and Biomedical Sciences at Massey University. The institute became the first veterinary school in the southern hemisphere to be accredited by the American Veterinary Medical Association. Other notable developments during this period were the launch of New Zealand Veterinary Pathology Ltd and the creation of the Hopkirk Institute, a joint venture with AgResearch in animal health and veterinary public health. Guilford faced opposition from animal rights activists, some of whom took direct action, with the Animal Liberation Front taking dogs from a farm owned by the University.

Guilford moved to the University of Auckland as Dean of Science in 2009. At the University of Auckland Faculty of Science, he launched a number of joint postgraduate schools with Crown Research Institutes and was responsible for the redevelopment of the Faculty's physical facilities at the Leigh Marine Laboratory and the Science Centre at the City Campus.

Guilford served as Vice-Chancellor of Victoria University of Wellington from March 2014 until 4 March 2022. During his eight years as Vice-Chancellor, staff numbers (FTE) increased from 1,990 in 2014 to 2,329 in 2021, his last full year as Vice-Chancellor, including a 23% increase in research and teaching staff. Over the same period, student numbers increased from 16,901 (EFTS) to 18,241, partly due to the growth in engineering and the establishment of a Faculty of Health along with on-going popularity of the humanities. Māori enrolments increased from 10.2% of the domestic student population to 11.9%. The University's consolidated revenues (including its Foundation) increased from $381 million to $530 million and net assets increased from $649 million to over $1 billion. External research income doubled to reach $89 million in 2021 and the University retained the rank of first overall in New Zealand for the intensity of high-quality research in the 2018 Performance-Based Research Funding assessment round.

In spite of this strong research performance, the University fell in the Times Higher Education rankings and remained static in the QS rankings during his tenure, trends similar to most other New Zealand universities. A better performance was achieved in the Times Higher Education Impact rankings in which the University was ranked 85th in the world in 2022, with rankings in support of the Sustainable Development Goals of climate action; peace, justice and strong institutions; and affordable clean energy (ranked 12th, 24th and 35th in the world, respectively).

During his time as Vice-Chancellor, the university added a new science building, Te Toki a Rata and a postgraduate student and administration block, Maru. Te Toki a Rata was opened by Prime Minister Jacinda Ardern.  Guilford also committed the university to redevelopment of the university's marae and partnering with the City in the redevelopment of the Wellington Town Hall for a national music centre. However, he directed most capital investment during his tenure into refurbishment and seismic strengthening of existing buildings on campus.

Embedding the University in the capital city was a major focus for Guilford. He modelled the university on the civic university tradition with an emphasis on community engagement. To encourage this closer relationship with Wellington, academic staff promotion criteria were changed to include engagement alongside teaching and research, physical facilities were developed throughout the city, the university's role in continuing professional development was enhanced through the launch of Wellington Uni-Professional (https://wellingtonuni-professional.nz/), and the University's branding was changed to emphasize the word "Wellington".

Controversies 

Under Guilford, the Victoria University of Wellington's Karori campus was sold by a tender process to private developers. The University had formally acquired the campus on the 1st of January 2005 following a merger with the Wellington College of Education. The sale prompted some controversy, as it was wrongly believed the University had acquired the land for $10 from the Ministry of Education. The Campus was sold for an undisclosed sum (the land was valued in excess of $20 million) to Ryman for the purposes of making a retirement village. This led to tension between the Ministry of Education, the Wellington City Council, the Karori community, and Victoria University of Wellington as many considered that it was improper for the university to make such a profit off public land. However, Guilford noted that the University had spent around $21 million upgrading the campus and it had invested the proceeds of the sale in seismic strengthening and a scholarship program for students from low decile schools in Wellington.   Six years after being moved to the Kelburn campus from Karori, Victoria University of Wellington's Education staff were still being housed in what they had been told was "temporary" student accommodation.

In May 2018, Guilford announced that Victoria University of Wellington was considering renaming the institution to "The University of Wellington" and replacing its existing Te Reo Māori name, Te Whare Wānanga o Te Ūpoko o Ti Ika A Māui, with a new Māori name of 'Te Herenga Waka'. Consultation on the proposal ended in early June 2018 and it was approved by the University Council. However, opposition to the proposed name change led to thousands of written submissions and a petition against the change being received from students, staff, graduates and alumni of the University. In December 2018, the Minister of Education, Chris Hipkins declined the name change. The Minister concluded: 'Given the level of opposition to the university's recommendation, including by its own staff, students and alumni, I am not persuaded that the recommendation is consistent with the demands of accountability and the national interest." The University then changed its logos and branding, emphasising Te Herenga Waka and Wellington in its name, a move described as "a name change by stealth." In reply, Guilford said stealthy branding would be an oxymoron and the Minister noted that the university's approach to branding was largely its own business and that he supported a change to the university's Māori name and broader efforts to enhance the University's international reputation.

A number of controversies arose during the COVID-19 pandemic. In response to the border and movement restrictions and the loss of income from international students, Guilford imposed new on-line teaching practices, funding cuts, pay restraint, hiring restrictions and voluntary redundancies alongside student fee discounts. These steps were unpopular with staff and students and there was also tension between Guilford's administration and staff represented by the Tertiary Education Union. In a 2020 interview, one of the university's most respected academics, Professor Lydia Wevers, said the university was at a crossroads, “brought to a head partly by Covid, and partly by this increasing and demonstrable sense the staff have that they don’t trust the senior leadership”. In December 2021, the Tertiary Education Union representative said that “short-term” and “careless” decisions from the senior leadership team had caused “lasting damage” to relationships with staff.

In August 2020, Guilford released a preliminary discussion document on the university’s academic structures. The document included 13 draft recommendations ‘to help clarify, challenge and progress our thinking prior to consultation’. One of these draft recommendations (to empower academic staff to create ‘affinity/management’ groups aligned with disciplines, sectors, research areas, or stakeholder groups as their ‘home base’) proved unpopular with staff and students being considered likely to result in the elimination of schools, a focussing of administration on the faculty offices, and significant job losses for administrative staff. In the face of overwhelming staff opposition, Guilford formally advised the University Council that he had decided to conclude the review of academic structures at the discussion stage and did not wish to seek the Council’s approval to consult on any formal ‘change proposals’.

Students were also critical of the refusal to automatically upscale the grades of students in response to the stresses incurred during the COVID-19 epidemic or discount fees for international and domestic students studying on-line. Guilford acknowledged the pressure the combination of cost-cutting and increased workload had placed on staff and students during the pandemic but maintained it was important for the University not to ‘kick the can down the road’. He used a speech at the university's Christmas party in 2020 to announce that because insufficient staff had taken redundancy, “unfortunately, therefore, it’s looking increasingly likely that to fulfil our commitments to kaitiakitanga and intergenerational responsibility, we will be facing hard decisions early next year.”

In 2020, the university was criticised following a decision to charge residents of the university's closed halls of residence a $150 per week fee once New Zealand moved to COVID-19 alert level three on 28 April 2020. Guilford responded to criticism with the explanation that the halls operate as a cost-recovery ancillary operation. He went on to say that without the hall fees being paid the university had to cross-subsidise the halls from the tuition revenue – disadvantaging the quality of the education of all students - or cut the costs of the halls which would mean staff losing their jobs. The proposed fee resulted in a student-led rent strike involving at least 1000 people. The university eventually relented on the decision to charge students and temporarily reinstated the fee waiver.

In 2020, Guilford had to apologise to Minister of Education Chris Hipkins, after claiming the Minister was "missing in action" during the covid pandemic. Asked about Guilford's accusation by National Party Education spokesperson Hon. Nikki Kaye, Hipkins told Parliament, "In fact, after the vice-chancellor of Victoria University made that comment, many other vice-chancellors contacted me to make it clear that that was not their view, and I have subsequently received an apology from the vice-chancellor of Victoria University."

Satire 
Guilford was occasionally a target for satirists while he was Vice-Chancellor. Wellington playwright Dave Armstrong was a regular critic, often using the label "Wellington University of Wellington" to describe Victoria University of Wellington after the controversy over the proposed changes to the University's name. He wrote of the VC of "Gumboot University" being seen in the Koru Club.  In September 2020 Armstrong assessed the performance of the university's Senior Leadership Team, awarding them grades for courses including "Ethics" (D-), "Branding 101" (E) and "Management 101" ("F for Fiasco"). This was followed by a reply countering "Armstrong’s most recent befuddled diatribe".

The Auckland University student magazine Craccum published a list of "did you know?" points about Guilford that included the claim that "On the 2nd of August, 2019, Grant Guilford became the first and only person on Earth to think ‘Wellington Victoria University of Wellington: Wellington School of Business’ would be a good name for a university faculty." It added that his favourite colour was "determination", and suggested "Grant Guilford’s Wikipedia page looks suspiciously like he’s been updating it himself." The 2022 Victoria University of Wellington Law Faculty revue, "Tomorrow when the law began", made fun of a "former Vice-Chancellor" called 'Grant Gilead'.

Climate Change 
Victoria University of Wellington divested itself from fossil fuels and implemented a five-point plan to reduce carbon emissions during Guilford's tenure as Vice-Chancellor. Guilford has called for politicians to act on climate change, and made a brief submission to the Ministry for the Environment consultation phase on setting New Zealand's post-2020 climate change target. He was the recipient of the Australasian Green Gown Award for sustainability leadership and now spends most of his time on two conservation blocks he owns with his wife.

Retirement 
Guilford announced his retirement from Victoria University of Wellington in 2021, to take effect on 4 March 2022. He was replaced by Acting Vice-Chancellor Jennifer Windsor, who in her first message to staff immediately announced a "re-set" and a "pause" of one-third of the strategic projects Guilford had pursued as university priorities. On 22 June, Professor Nic Smith from Queensland University of Technology was announced as Victoria University of Wellington's next Vice-Chancellor.

Roles outside of academia 
As of 2023, Guilford is currently the Chair of the New Zealand Veterinary Association. He has previously held positions on the board of the Wellington Regional Economic Development Agency,  several companies, including New Zealand Genomics Limited, centres of research excellence, including the Maurice Wilkins Centre for Molecular Biodiscovery, and the Crown Research Institute Landcare Research Limited.

References

External links
 
 Profile on Victoria University site
 

Living people
University of Missouri faculty
University of California, Davis alumni
University of California, Davis faculty
Massey University alumni
Academic staff of the Massey University
Vice-chancellors of Victoria University of Wellington
New Zealand veterinarians
Year of birth missing (living people)